Selectors of All-Pros for the 1960 National Football League season included the Associated Press (AP), United Press International (UPI), New York Daily News (NYDN), Newspaper Enterprise Association (NEA), and The Sporting News (SN).

Offensive selections

Quarterbacks
 Norm Van Brocklin, Philadelphia Eagles (AP, NEA, UPI)
 Milt Plum, Cleveland Browns (AP-2)
 Johnny Unitas, Baltimore Colts (NEA-2)

Halfbacks
 Paul Hornung, Green Bay Packers (AP, NEA, UPI) 
 Lenny Moore, Baltimore Colts (AP, NEA, UPI)
 John David Crow, St. Louis Cardinals (NEA, AP-2)
 Tom Tracy, Pittsburgh Steelers (AP-2, NEA-2)
 Bobby Mitchell, Cleveland Browns (NEA-2)

Fullbacks
 Jim Brown, Cleveland Browns (AP, NEA, UPI)
 Jim Taylor, Green Bay Packers (AP-2, NEA-2)

Ends
 Raymond Berry, Baltimore Colts (AP, NEA, UPI)
 Sonny Randle, St. Louis Cardinals (AP, UPI, NEA-2)
 Tommy McDonald, Philadelphia Eagles (NEA)
 Jim Phillips, Los Angeles Rams (AP-2)
 R. C. Owens, San Francisco 49ers (AP-2)
 Kyle Rote, New York Giants (NEA-2)

Tackles
 Jim Parker, Baltimore Colts (AP, NEA, UPI)
 Forrest Gregg, Green Bay Packers (AP)
 Rosey Brown, New York Giants (UPI, AP-2, NEA-2)
 Bob St. Clair, San Francisco 49ers (NEA, AP-2)

Guards
 Jim Ray Smith, Cleveland Browns (AP, NEA, UPI)
 Jerry Kramer, Green Bay Packers (AP)
 Stan Jones, Chicago Bears (UPI, AP-2)
 Jack Stroud, New York Giants (NEA, AP-2)
 Art Spinney, Baltimore Colts (NEA-2)
 Bruce Bosley, San Francisco 49ers (NEA-2)

Centers
 Jim Ringo, Green Bay Packers (AP, NEA, UPI)
 Art Hunter, Los Angeles Rams (AP-2, NEA-2)

Defensive selections

Defensive ends
 Gino Marchetti, Baltimore Colts (AP, NEA, UPI)
 Andy Robustelli, New York Giants (AP, NEA-2)
 Doug Atkins, Chicago Bears (NEA, UPI, AP-2)
 Charlie Krueger, San Francisco 49ers (AP-2)
 John Paluck, Washington Redskins (NEA-2)

Defensive tackles
 Henry Jordan, Green Bay Packers (AP, UPI, NEA-2)
 Alex Karras, Detroit Lions (AP, UPI)
 Gene Lipscomb, Baltimore Colts (NEA)
 Bob Toneff, Washington Redskins (NEA)
 Leo Nomellini, San Francisco 49ers (AP-2)
 Art Donovan, Baltimore Colts (AP-2)
 Ernie Stautner, Pittsburgh Steelers (NEA-2)

Linebackers
 Chuck Bednarik, Philadelphia Eagles (AP, UPI)
 Bill George, Chicago Bears (AP, NEA, UPI)
 Bill Forester, Green Bay Packers (AP, UPI, NEA-2)
 Sam Huff, New York Giants (NEA, AP-2)
 Joe Schmidt, Detroit Lions (NEA, AP-2)
 Les Richter, Los Angeles Rams (AP-2)
 John Reger, Pittsburgh Steelers (NEA-2)
 Bill Pellington, Baltimore Colts (NEA-2)

Defensive backs
 Tom Brookshier, Philadelphia Eagles (AP, NEA, UPI)
 Abe Woodson, San Francisco 49ers (AP, NEA-2)
 Jerry Norton, St. Louis Cardinals (AP, NEA, UPI)
 Jimmy Patton, New York Giants (AP, NEA, UPI)
 Night Train Lane, Detroit Lions (NEA, UPI)
 Ed Meador, Los Angeles Rams (AP-2)
 Jesse Whittenton, Green Bay Packers (AP-2)
 Dave Baker, San Francisco 49ers (AP-2, NEA-2)
 Don Burroughs, Philadelphia Eagles (AP-2, NEA-2)
 Yale Lary, Detroit Lions (NEA-2)

References

External links
 1960 NFL All-Pros – Pro-Football-Reference

All-Pro Teams
1960 National Football League season